D. Luís Carlos Inácio Xavier de Meneses, 1st Marquis of Louriçal, 5th Count of Ericeira, (4 November 1689 - 1742), was a Portuguese nobleman and statesman, that served as Viceroy of India twice.

Early life
Luís Carlos Inácio Xavier de Meneses was born on 4 November 1689, to Francisco Xavier de Meneses, 4th Count of Ericeira, and D. Joana Madalena de Noronha, daughter of Luís Lobo da Silveira, 2nd Count of Sarzedas and Mariana da Silva e Lencastre. He was brother to fr. António da Piedade, a noted clergyman of his time. He grew up under the tutelage of his great uncle, Fernando de Meneses, 2nd Count of Ericeira, and his grandfather, Luís de Meneses, 3rd Count of Ericeira.

Viceroy of India
His two tenures as Viceroy of Portuguese India were notable for his continued military successes and for his economic rehabilitation policies. His first tenure, between 1717 and 1721, started when he was only 27 and arrived in Goa, with 6 six ships and 2,000 soldiers. Power and expansive policies led him to be dubbed the "greatest of the governors of the Orient of the first half of the 18th century."

Genealogy

Ancestry

Issue

References

Bibliography

 

Viceroys of Portuguese India
Portuguese nobility
1689 births
1742 deaths